JeffTran is a public transit agency in Jefferson City, Missouri.

It operates six regular fixed bus routes with two transport hubs and on call curb to curb paratransit service during typical weekday business hours. During the school year, JeffTran also provides three afternoon specialty tripper routes for all passengers, but is intended to take high school students on a direct route from a school to a transport hub.

In 2016, JeffTran provided service to 299,408 riders, down from 313,750 riders in 2015.

Live bus tracking is also available through DoubleMap's website and their Android and Apple apps for passengers' convenience.

Fares
Fares are valid as of September 9, 2018.

One way fares

Regular fixed route: $1

Other passes

Adult passes: $20 for 20 rides
Student passes: $18 for 20 rides

Free and reduced fares

Children under six years of age ride free while pre-approved seniors and disabled persons are eligible for half-fare rides.

Transfer fares

Transfers are free and are given to the customer upon request to the driver for use at the transport hub.

Paratransit fares

In addition, paratransit service may be provided for persons with limited mobility who call one day in advance and pay a $2.00 one way fare.

Routes

Transport hubs
JeffTran has two transport hubs, which are also locally known as transfer stations. The main transport hub is at JeffTran's operational headquarters and serves all routes except Capital Mall. A secondary transport hub is the standalone bus shelter area at the north end of Stonecreek Drive, which is near the parking lot of the Stadium Boulevard Walmart. This second transport hub only serves the Capital Mall and Missouri Blvd routes.

This partially decentralized setup means, for example, a person located west of this Walmart who wants to ride Business 50 East, High Street West, High Street East, or Southwest must get on the Capital Mall bus, transfer to the Missouri Blvd bus at the secondary transport hub, and then transfer again at the main transport hub to one of the other listed buses. It also means that anybody riding these routes who want to transfer to the Capital Mall bus have to get on the Missouri Blvd bus at the main transport hub and then transfer to the Capital Mall bus at the secondary transport hub.

References

External links
JeffTran

Bus transportation in Missouri
Jefferson City, Missouri